Lisa Ekdahl (born 29 July 1971 in Hägersten, Stockholm, Sweden) is a Swedish popular music singer and songwriter. She has so far released 10 albums, most of them in Swedish but some entirely in English. Her voice has been described as "child-like" and "soft, supple and smooth".

Career
In 1994, at the age of 22, Ekdahl became famous overnight in Sweden with her self-titled debut album and the No. 1 hit single "Vem vet" ("Who Knows?"). The record sold almost 800,000 copies and she was awarded three Swedish music prizes, one of them as the nation's best artist of the year. She also enjoyed success in Denmark and Norway.

She signed with EMI Records, but later recorded two pop albums with RCA/BMG: "Med Kroppen Mot Jorden" and "Bortom Det Blå" in 1996 and 1997. In 1998, she recorded the English language album "When Did You Leave Heaven", which contained jazz standards. Ekdahl has been focusing on, with great success, Scandinavia and Europe (most noticeably France), leaving little mark in other countries such as the United States. Her following album, "Back To Earth" (1999), was again full of jazz standards and, like her jazz debut, recorded with the Peter Nordahl Trio. In France alone, it sold over 40,000 copies. She received positive reviews for her live appearances in Great Britain from The Daily Telegraph and The Guardian.

Ekdahl's sixth album, "Lisa Ekdahl sings Salvadore Poe" (2000), signaled a new direction and critical esteem. As the new album's title indicates, Ekdahl exclusively sings songs written by her husband, also known as Paul DiBartolo, guitarist in New York glam metal band Spread Eagle (band), primarily in the bossa nova style. Her fragile and childish voice seems to be made for this type of music. Their album was a great success in France and Scandinavia, where it sold over 120,000 copies by early 2001.

Her voice is variously compared to Blossom Dearie, Diana Krall, and perhaps most accurately, Astrud Gilberto. Her hit song "Vem Vet" is also in the soundtrack of the Korean drama Love Rain.

In 2016 she participated in the music show Så mycket bättre broadcast on TV4.

Personal life
She was born in Hägersten, Sweden to her parents who were a nuclear physicist and kindergarten teacher.  She was raised just outside Mariefred, Sweden.  She has two sisters and attended school at the Tälje Musikgymnasium. Her music is published by her company Lisa Ekdahl AB.

Ekdahl has lived in New York City. In 1999, she met American composer and guitarist Salvadore Poe, former guitarist of 1990s New York sleaze rockers Spread Eagle on a flight to India. They married in 2000, and they later collaborated on an album together. They are now divorced. She was previously married to Swedish singer Bill Öhrström, with whom she has a son Milton (born 23 December 1994). She also has a daughter born in 2012.

She currently lives in the Södermalm district of Stockholm.

Awards
 Rockbjörn-- "Best Female Artist" 1994
 Swedish Grammys—1994
Artist of the year, Female Pop
Rock artist of the Year
Album of the Year
The Ulla Billquist scholarship

Discography

Singles

Solo albums 
1994: Lisa Ekdahl
1996: Med kroppen mot jorden
1997: Bortom det blå
2000: Sings Salvadore Poe
2004: Olyckssyster
2006: Pärlor av glas
2009: Give Me That Slow Knowing Smile
2014: Look to Your Own Heart
2016: Tolkningarna – Så mycket bättre Säsong 7
2017: När alla vägar leder hem
2018: More of the Good

Live albums 
2011: At the Olympia Paris

Compilations 
2002: Heaven Earth & Beyond
2003: En samling sånger

Collaborations 
1995: When Did You Leave Heaven (with the Peter Nordahl trio)
1998: Back to Earth (with the Peter Nordahl trio)
2000: Duet with Henri Salvador in the song "All I Really Want Is Love" on his album Chambre Avec Vue
2001: Kiss & Hug: From a Happy Boy (duet with Danish singer Lars H.U.G. in the song "Backwards")
2003: Duet with Rod Stewart in the song "Where or When" on his album As Time Goes By: The Great American Songbook 2

See also 
 List of Swedes in music

References

External links 
Official artist's site
A Swedish fan page (English in progress)
Lisa Ekdahl tribute page (English)
Lyrics Explained: Swedish lyrics explanation
Lisa Ekdahl discography
Lisa Ekdahl biography, photos, CD and concert reviews by cosmopolis.ch

1971 births
Living people
Swedish pop singers
Swedish songwriters
Swedish-language singers
21st-century Swedish singers
21st-century Swedish women singers
RCA Victor artists
Jive Records artists
Bertelsmann Music Group artists